Laeva Parish was a rural municipality in Tartu County, Estonia. Since 2017, it has been a part of the larger Tartu Parish.

Settlements
Villages
Kämara - Kärevere - Laeva - Siniküla - Väänikvere - Valmaotsa

Gallery

References

External links